Sepia koilados is a species of cuttlefish native to the southeastern Indian Ocean, specifically the North West Shelf in western Australia ( to ). It lives at depths of between 182 and 203 m.

Males are slightly larger than females. They grow to a mantle length of 68 mm and 58 mm, respectively.

The type specimen was collected in the North West Shelf ( to ). It is deposited at the Museum of Victoria in Melbourne.

References

External links

Cuttlefish
Molluscs described in 2000
Taxa named by Amanda Reid (malacologist)